Katikkiro is the official title of the prime minister of the Kingdom of Buganda, a traditional kingdom in modern-day Uganda. The current Katikkiro is Charles Peter Mayiga of the mutima clan appointed by the current monarch, the Kabaka of Buganda, Muwenda Mutebi II of Buganda in May 2013, replacing engineer John Baptist Walusimbi.

History
This title is as old as the kingdom itself. The first known Katikkiro was a man named Walusimbi of the Ffumbe Clan, who was the prime minister during the reign of Chwa I Nabakka, the second Kabaka of Buganda, who reigned during the middle of the 14th century. Walusimbi continued to rule following the death of Chwa I. He was succeeded as Katikkiro by Sebwaana. This period lasted until 1374, when Kabaka Kimera I ascended the throne circa 1374.

List of Katikkiro 

 [with Tebandeke]           Mujambula
 [with Ndawula]             Nsobya
 [with Kagulu]              Ntambi
 [with Kikulwe]             Mawuuba
 [with Kikulwe]             Nakiyenje
 [with Kikulwe]             Nakikofu
 1740? - 1741               Ssebanakitta
 1741 - 1750                Kagali
 1750 - 17..                Kabinuli
 17.. - 1780                Lugoloobi
 1780 - 17..                Ssendegeya
 17.. - 17..                Mayembe
 17.. - 1797                Kagenda
 1797 - ....                Nabbunga
 .... - ....                Ssekayiba
 .... - ....                Nabembezi
 1814?                      Kadduwamala
 18.. - 18..                Katimpa
 18.. - 18..                Kafumbirwango
 18.. - 18..                Kimoga
 18.. - 1832                Ssebuko
 1832 - 18..                Migeekyamye
 Kayiira (1856?)
 Kisomose (18.. - 18..)
 Mayanja (18.. - 18..)
 Mulere (18.. - 18..)
 Mukasa (1884? - 1888)
 Nnyonyintono (1888)
 Muguluma (1888 - 1889)
 Apollo Kaggwa (1889 - 1926)
 Kisosonkole (Feb 1927 - 1929)
 Martin Luther Nsibirwa (1929-1941)
 Samuel Wamala (1941-1945)
 Martin Luther Nsibirwa (1945)
 Michael Kawalya Kagwa (1945-1950)
 Paulo Kavuma (1950–1955)
 Michael Kintu (1955-1964)
 Joash Mayanja Nkangi (1964-1993)
 Joseph Mulwanyammuli Ssemwogerere (1994-2005)
 Dan Muliika (2005-2007)
 Emmanuel Ndawula (2007-2008)
 John Baptist Walusimbi (2008-2013)
 Charles Mayiga (2013–present)

See also
 Lukiiko
 Bulange
 Buganda

References

Buganda

African noble titles
African traditional governments